Dasyskenea suavis is a species of sea snail, a marine gastropod mollusk in the family Skeneidae.

Distribution
This species occurs off Sicily in the Mediterranean Sea.

References

 Fasulo G. & Cretella M. (2002). Dasyskenea suavis gen. et sp. nov. (Gastropoda: Skeneidae). La Conchiglia 305: 31–34

suavis
Gastropods described in 2002